The NSW Cup, currently known as the Knock-On Effect NSW Cup for sponsorship reasons, is a rugby league competition for clubs in New South Wales. The competition has a history dating back to the NSWRFL's origins in 1908, starting off as a reserve grade competition, and is now the premier open age competition in the state. The NSW Cup was the Reserve Grade/Presidents Cup/First Division from 1908 until 2002, and the NSWRL Premier League from 2003 to 2007, the NSW Cup from 2008 to 2015, the Intrust Super Premiership NSW from 2016 to 2018, the Canterbury Cup NSW from 2019 to 2020. The New South Wales Cup, along with the Queensland Cup, acts as a feeder competition to the National Rugby League premiership. The competition is the oldest continuous rugby league competition in the Australia.

The NSW Cup is contested by reserve squads of NSW-based NRL teams and also includes sides representing teams that once competed at the first grade level in the NSWRL Premiership but no longer field teams in the NRL competition, and teams that have not fielded teams in the NRL competition. The North Sydney Bears are the only team to have competed in every season, since the start of the competition since 1908.

Clubs

New South Wales Cup teams

The New South Wales Cup consists of 13 teams, 11 from New South Wales, and 1 each from Auckland and from Australian Capital Territory. The league operates on a single group system, with no divisions or conferences and no relegation and promotion from other leagues. A number of clubs in the New South Wales Cup have an affiliation with a team in the Australian national competition, the National Rugby League, with most of the clubs in the being reserve grade teams to the senior grade teams of the NRL.

Bold indicates it is the club's highest level of competition
*: The season the team joined competition in its current form and consecutive tenure.
+: Current affiliation between Cronulla and Newtown since 2015.

Former teams – NSW Cup 
Of the 26 former clubs in the 21st century, 1 was each based in Australian Capital Territory, Queensland and Victoria, 2 were based in Auckland Region and the other 23 former clubs were based in New South Wales.

Former teams – Reserve Grade/First Division/Premier League

Of the 24 former clubs in the 20th century, 1 was based in Auckland Region, South Australia and Western Australia, 3 were based in Queensland and the other 20 former clubs were based in New South Wales.

† The club also competed in the second grade/reserve grade of the 1997 Super League competition.

History

20th Century
The New South Wales Cup, run by the NSWRL, has been known by a variety of names and operated in several different ways since the inception of the NSWRL Premiership in 1908.  Between 1908 and 1996, the competition was known as Reserve Grade and was competed for almost exclusively by reserve squads of each of the NSWRL Premiership Clubs, competing with that Club's name and colours.  With the advent of the Super League war, and the resultant split competition in 1997, the NSWRL reconfigured the competition as the Presidents Cup. From 2002 until 2007, the competition was known as the NSWRL Premier League until it was reorganised into its present form as the New South Wales Cup in 2008.

'Stand-alone' clubs
With the competitions having merged back together, and with six NSWRL Premiership clubs having merged or became joint-ventures into three new NRL clubs (St. George Dragons and Illawarra Steelers; North Sydney and Manly; Balmain Tigers and Western Suburbs) the competition became known as the First Division and included these sides competing under their original name and colours.

The inclusion of these non-NRL clubs (along with the return of the Newtown Jets in 2000) in the competition signalled a move away from the 'reserve squad' competition it had become and became increasingly differentiated from the NRL competition with games played at non-NRL venues such as North Sydney Oval, Marrickville's Henson Park and Western Weekender Stadium at St Marys.

Another trend that began during this period was the phenomenon of NRL clubs outsourcing competing teams, with several NRL clubs choosing not to field sides in this competition and rather field either merged entities (as in the St Marys Penrith Cougars and Balmain Ryde Eastwood Tigers, both formed with NSWRL Jim Beam Cup sides) or form agreements with another club to take their place in the competition, those players being eligible for NRL selection, such as the agreement between Newtown Jets and Sydney Roosters for the 2006 season.

NSW Cup Era

2007-09 Expansion
In 2007, Bartercard Cup club Auckland Lions joined the competition.

In 2008 and 2009, Jersey Flegg Cup club Central Coast Storm fielded a team in the competition.  The team was based on the NSW Central Coast but acted as a feeder club to the Melbourne Storm.
In addition the Panthers were replaced by the Windsor Wolves and the Sharks were replaced by the Cronulla-Sutherland Cobras. The Canberra Raiders withdrew from the competition on 1 August 2007.  The Newcastle Knights  also announced a joint venture with the Central Charlestown. The team used the original Central Newcastle Rebels Name. The Parramatta Eels also formed a joint-venture with the Wentworthville Magpies to act as their Feeder Club in the competition from 2008 onwards. The Saints decided to no longer run a Reserve Grade Side, but would use the St George District Rugby League & the Illawarra District Rugby League competitions instead as their Feeder Team/s.

Two new teams have been added to the competition. These two new teams will have both previously played in the Jim Beam Cup. The Shellharbour City Dragons, previously known as the Shellharbour Marlins, will be the St George-Illawarra Dragons feeder side. The Bankstown Bulls, who were known as the Sydney Bulls, will act as the Canterbury Bulldogs feeder side. Bankstown will still field a team in the Jim Beam Cup. The Manly Sea Eagles have withdrawn from the competition and will have a feeder team in the Queensland Cup. Newcastle had also withdrawn from the competition, discontinuing the link with the Central Newcastle Rebels.

2010-12 Seasons
Season 2012 saw the return of feeder clubs for NRL teams St George Illawarra and Canberra. The Illawarra Steelers, in partnership with Illawarra Coal and the Illawarra Leagues Club re-entered a team into the league, the Illawarra Cutters. They previously acted as a feeder club to the Dragons. A Mounties Rugby League Club also entered the NSW Cup this season and is the Raiders' feeder club.

2013-15 Expansion
The 2013 season saw Wyong Roos enter a team in the NSW Cup for the first time. It will not be a feeder team to any NRL team.
2013 was also the first time in Rugby League history that teams with the names Western Suburbs and Balmain will not field a team in the cup, they played as the Wests Tigers. There is a current state of ambiguity surrounding this joint venture, and it is suggested that both Wests and Balmain will return as two separate clubs once financial requirements are met.

In 2014 the Auckland Vulcans were replaced by a side from the New Zealand Warriors. The Penrith Panthers will also be returning to the competition in 2014, replacing Windsor, who remain in the Ron Massey Cup.

2016-18: Intrust Super Premiership 

On 29 January 2016 it was announced that Intrust Super had secured naming rights for the competition for a three-year agreement The name would have been decided not to be confused with the Queensland-based competition the Intrust Super Cup.

On 5 July 2016, it was announced that starting the following season, the Blacktown Workers will become the feeder club for the Manly-Warringah Sea Eagles in a joint-venture agreement. The Blacktown Workers Sea Eagles made their NSW Cup debut in Round 1 of the 2017 Season with a defeat to the Newtown Jets, before finishing 10th in the regular season and subsequently missing a post-season berth.

In September, Intrust Super extended their naming rights partnership with the New South Wales State Cup through to the end of the 2018 season.

On 27 October 2017, it was announced that Illawarra would be replaced by The St George Illawarra Dragons for The 2018 Intrust Super Premiership NSW season as part of a restructure in the competition.

In late November, 2017 it was announced that as part of a re-brand, the Western Suburbs Magpies will enter the competition from the following season acting as a feeder club to the Wests Tigers, who had previously competed under their own brand.

2019-2020: Canterbury Cup NSW

On 2 March 2018, it was reported that the board of the Wyong Roos, feeder to Sydney Roosters since 2014, voted to cut all ties with the club at end of the 2018 season. As a result, the Wyong Roos did not take part in the 2019 Intrust Super Premiership. On 5 September 2018, it was announced that the North Sydney Bears would assume the status as the official feeder club to the Roosters NRL side until at least the end of the 2023 season, with Jason Taylor, a former North Sydney player and assistant coach to the Roosters, appointed head coach. Taylor, after leading the Bears to a third-place finish at the end of the regular season, was announced to have signed a two-year extension on November 5, 2019.

On 7 March 2019, it was announced that apparel company Canterbury of New Zealand won the rights to be the new naming partner of the NSW Cup competition which was renamed the Canterbury Cup NSW.  The deal was announced to run to the end of the 2024 season.  The NSWRL also announced that the new Western Sydney Stadium would host the grand final in each of those seasons under the deal.

South Sydney, having had a previous feeder relationship with North Sydney, would then field their own team in the Intrust Super Premiership, keeping the number of competing teams at 12.

On 10 October 2018, it was reported that the Parramatta Eels would field a team in the Intrust Super Premiership starting 2020, thus ending their relationship with the Wentworthville Magpies at this time. It was announced that former Wyong Roos coach, Rip Taylor, would coach the Magpies in their final season.

On Friday, March 27, 2020, after round one of the season was completed, the 2020 Canterbury Cup NSW competition was suspended, and subsequently cancelled due to the COVID-19 pandemic, with no premiers being crowned.

2021-Present: Knock-on Effect NSW Cup

On June 8, 2020, the New Zealand Warriors and Redcliffe Dolphins announced a partnership agreement, effectively withdrawing the Warriors from the Canterbury Cup competition. Through this initiative a number of players from outside the Warriors’ NRL squad will appear for the Dolphins in the Intrust Super Cup each week.

On August 28, 2020, the Canterbury-Bankstown Bulldogs announced a joint venture with the Mount Pritchard Mounties for two years. As part of the joint venture, the Mounties will represent Canterbury-Bankstown in the Canterbury Cup, ending their nine-year relationship with the Canberra Raiders. At the time the Canberra Raiders were set to go it alone in 2021 rather than form an affiliation with a NSW Cup side 

On November 10, 2020, the NSWRL confirmed that the NSW Cup would return in 2021 with a 10-team competition, however Canterbury would no longer hold naming rights. A a new naming rights partner is expected to be revealed prior to season launch on 3 March 2021.

On January 28, 2021, it was announced that the Canberra Raiders would be returning to the competition, fielding their own team or the first time since the 2007 season, thus increasing the number of competing teams to 11 in 2021. The competition is due to commence March 13, 2021.

On March 3, 2021, a new naming rights sponsor, The Knock-On Effect, was named at the launch of the 2021 season. The new partnership will be in place for the next three years replacing the previous sponsor, Canterbury NZ.

For the second consecutive year, the competition was cancelled on August 10, 2021, after completion of 15 out of 24 scheduled rounds, due to the ongoing COVID-19 pandemic.

On 29 October 2021, it was announced that the Canterbury-Bankstown Bulldogs would be running their own team in the NSW Cup in 2022, in addition to continuing their partnership with Mounties for a further season due to contractual obligations 

The draw for the 2022 season was released on 17 Dec 2021, and announced a revision to the finals-system to a top five, a decrease from the previous top eight.

On 17 August 2022, the New Zealand Warriors announced they would be re-joining the NSW Cup after a three-year absence, ending their partnership with the Redcliffe Dolphins.

On 9 November 2022, the Sydney Roosters announced they would field their own team in the NSW Cup commencing in the 2023 season, ending their partnership with the North Sydney Bears from 2024 onwards.

Broadcast & Media

Television
The 2023 season broadcast deal features:
 One game per week on Fox League/Kayo Sports at either Saturday or Sunday 12:30pm
 Two games per week on NSWRLTV
 One final per week on Fox League/Kayo with another on Nine.

Radio
SWR Triple 9 FM broadcast two games a month during the season plus some finals matches.

Hawkesbury Radio broadcast Penrith Panthers' matches online during the season when played on non-NRL game days, selected other matches and all the finals matches.

Triple H Radio broadcast selected North Sydney Bears' matches during the year plus selected finals matches.

There is also additional radio coverage of the finals series on 2GB Radio and 702 ABC Sydney.

Online 
The NSWRL website upload highlights of every game of the NSW Cup. It also gives half time and full-time scores of the other games.

Twice a week one NSW Cup match is LIVE on Facebook.

Premiership Winners 

Reserve Grade/First Division(1908–2002)
NSWRL Premier League(2003–2007)
New South Wales Cup(2008–2015)
Intrust Super Premiership NSW(2016–2018)
Canterbury Cup NSW(2019–2020)
The Knock-on Effect NSW Cup(2021–present)

Number of premiership wins
 Team names in bold are the teams currently playing in the New South Wales Cup

 Team names in bold are the teams currently playing in the New South Wales Cup

 The first 8 premierships won by the Roosters in this grade were as the Eastern Suburbs Roosters, with the 9th premiership won as the Sydney Roosters

Participating clubs by season

NRL State Championship Match

Since 2014, The NSW Cup Grand Final Match has been played on the same day as the QLD Cup Grand Final, the weekend prior to the NRL Grand Final, allowing for the creation of the NRL State Championship which saw the NSW Cup premiers face off against the QLD Cup Premiers as a curtain raiser to the NRL Grand Final, originally following the National Youth Competition Grand Final from 2014 to 2017 and following the NRL Women's Grand Final in their inaugural premiership year in 2018.

In 2019 the NRL State Championship was played prior the NRL Women's Grand Final. The 2020 State Championship was cancelled due to the Queensland and New South Wales competitions being cancelled after Round 1 due to the COVID-19 pandemic, and the 2021 State Championship was cancelled due to the COVID-19 lockdown in Sydney. Newtown Jets became the fourth NSWRL team to win in as many years after the first two championships were won by the QRL.

Champions:  New South Wales Cup
 Illawarra Cutters (2016)
 Penrith Panthers (2017)
 Canterbury-Bankstown Bulldogs (2018)
 Newtown Jets (2019)
 Penrith Panthers (2022)

NRL State Championship winners

Third Grade 
In addition to Reserve Grade, there was a Third Grade competition contested from 1908 until the 1980s.

See also

 NRL State Championship
 Queensland Cup
 Ron Massey Cup
 Sydney Shield
 Presidents Cup
 NSW Challenge Cup
Rugby League Competitions in Australia

Notes
 This was the year of the split competitions.  This competition was known as Presidents Cup for this season, while the Super League competition was known as Reserve Grade (won by Canterbury Bulldogs). This competition was a merger of Reserve Grade and Third Grade (usually known as the Presidents Cup.

References

 
Recurring sporting events established in 1908
1908 establishments in Australia
Sports leagues established in 1908
Rugby league in Sydney
Rugby league competitions in New South Wales
Professional sports leagues in Australia
Professional sports leagues in New Zealand
Multi-national professional sports leagues